The term "ocker" is used both as a noun and adjective for an Australian who speaks and acts in a rough and uncultivated manner, using Strine, a broad Australian accent.

Definition
Richard Neville defined ockerism as being "about conviviality: comradeship with a touch of good-hearted sexism". It is mostly fairly neutral, even affectionate—although it can be used in a pejorative sense, especially by Australians who consider themselves cultured or enlightened, or "up themselves" as an "ocker" would say.

History
"Ocker" was recorded from 1916 as a nickname for anyone called Oscar. The 1920s Australian comic strip Ginger Meggs contained a character called Oscar ("Ocker") Stevens. The term "ocker" for a stereotypically uncouth Australian came into use when a character of that name, played by Ron Frazer, appeared in the satirical television comedy series The Mavis Bramston Show.

Uses
Politicians, including former Prime Minister of Australia Kevin Rudd, will often take on "ocker" cultural elements such as slang to appeal to various audiences.

Films
Many films made during the Australian film renaissance of the 1970s were marketed as "ocker comedies", representing a "masculine, populist, and cheerfully vulgar view of Australian society". These films were latterly described as "Ozploitation". While popular with audiences, most ocker films were loathed by critics. Among the best known are Stork (1971), The Adventures of Barry McKenzie (1972), and Alvin Purple (1973). The hugely successful 1997 film The Castle is regarded as an updated variation on the ocker genre.

See also
Bogan
Bruces sketch
Larrikin
Westie
Yobbo

References 

Australian culture
Australian slang
New Zealand culture
New Zealand slang
Pejorative terms for white people
Social class subcultures
Stereotypes